Erisa Kabiri Masaba, MBE was an Anglican bishop in Uganda.

Masaba was ordained deacon in 1933 and priest in 1934. He served in the Diocese of the Upper Nile. He was a lecturer at Buwalasi Theological College from 1940 to 1943; and a chaplain to the British Armed Forces from 1943 to 1948. He was archdeacon of Mbale from 1953 to 1961 and Bishop of Mbale from 1964 to 1975 (he was also dean).

References

20th-century Anglican bishops in Uganda
Members of the Order of the British Empire
Anglican bishops of Mbale
Bulwalasi Theological College faculty
Anglican deans in Africa
Anglican archdeacons in Africa